The following is a list of episodes from the PBS Kids series Ready Jet Go!.


Series overview

Episodes

Season 1 (2016–2018)

Season 2 (2018–2019)

Films

References

Ready Jet Go
Ready Jet Go